Silvianópolis is a municipality in the state of Minas Gerais in the Southeast region of Brazil. It was the birthplace of the physician and physiologist
Wilson Teixeira Beraldo (1917–1998)
List of municipalities in Minas Gerais

References

Municipalities in Minas Gerais